Rollin' is the second studio album by American metal band Texas Hippie Coalition. It was released on July 6, 2010 and reached number 29 on the US Heatseekers Albums chart.

Production 
The album, which was their first with Carved Records, contains Version 2 of "Pissed Off and Mad About it" (the first single from the band) produced by David Prater.

Touring 
The band toured the United States and Europe in mid-2010 with a stop at Bospop Festival in the Netherlands.

Critical reception 

The album was touted by VH1's That Metal Show as "one of the greatest sophomore albums ever".

Track listing

Personnel 
 Big Dad Ritch – lead vocals
 John Exall – bass
 Randy Cooper – guitar
 Alden "Crawfish" Nequent – guitar
 Ryan "The Kid" Bennett – drums

Charts

References 

2010 albums
Texas Hippie Coalition albums